Lamine Diack (born 15 November 2000) is a Senegalese football player who plays as a defensive midfielder for Ankaragücü.

Professional career
A product of the youth academy of the Oslo FA in Senegal, Diack transferred to the Macedonian club Shkupi on 7 June 2019, signing a 2-year contract. After 2 seasons in the Macedonian First Football League, Diack moved to the TFF First League with Tuzlaspor on 11 August 2021. In the summer of 2022 his license was issued to Fenerbahçe, who promptly transferred him to Ankaragücü on 25 July 2022 on a 3+1 year contract. He made his Süper Lig with Ankaragücü in a 0–0 tie with Konyaspor on 8 August 2022.

International career
Diack represented the Senegal U20s at the 2019 Africa U-20 Cup of Nations.

References

External links
 
 

2000 births
Living people
Footballers from Dakar
Senegalese footballers
Senegal youth international footballers
FK Shkupi players
Tuzlaspor players
Fenerbahçe S.K. footballers
MKE Ankaragücü footballers
Süper Lig players
TFF First League players
Macedonian First Football League players
Association football midfielders
Senegalese expatriate footballers
Senegalese expatriates in North Macedonia
Expatriate footballers in North Macedonia
Senegalese expatriate sportspeople in Turkey
Expatriate footballers in Turkey